Çobanlar District is a district of Afyonkarahisar Province of Turkey. Its seat is the town Çobanlar. Its area is 165 km2, and its population is 14,131 (2021).

Composition
There are two municipalities in Çobanlar District:
 Çobanlar
 Kocaöz

There are 3 villages in Çobanlar District:
 Akkoyunlu
 Göynük
 Kaleköy

References

External links
 District governor's official website 

Districts of Afyonkarahisar Province